Bourglinster is a small town in the commune of Junglinster, in central Luxembourg.  , the town has a population of 740.

The town's 11th century restored Bourglinster Castle, with its onsite restaurant, is frequently used as a venue for conferences and cultural events.

References

Junglinster
Towns in Luxembourg